Julcán (possibly from Quechua qullqa, deposit, storehouse, -n a suffix) is a  mountain in the Huayhuash mountain range in the Andes of Peru. It is located in the Lima Region, Cajatambo Province, Cajatambo District. Julcán lies on a sub-range west of the main range, southwest of Mitopunta and southeast of Huacshash. It is situated north of the Pumarinri valley.

References

Mountains of Peru
Mountains of Lima Region